Xeno Müller (born 7 August 1972) is a Swiss rower and Olympic gold medallist.

Early career and university
His first international appearance was at the 1990 World Rowing Junior Championships – winning bronze in his single scull (1x).

He first competed at the senior level in 1991, and at the age of 19, finished 11th at the World Rowing Championships in Vienna in the single scull. At the 1992 Barcelona Olympics, he just missed making the finals, finishing fourth in the semi-finals (3 to advance).  Müller chose not to start the petite (consolation) finals for places 7 through 12 because of a back injury. In 1994 and 1995, he finished 2nd and 6th, respectively, at the World Championships.

During this period, Müller began studying at Brown University in the United States.  He helped lead Brown to an undefeated season and a national championship in 1993 in the eight-man boat. Following this collegiate victory and his subsequent disappointing finish at the 1993 World Championships in the double scull event, Müller decided to concentrate solely on the single scull.  This decision created friction between Müller and the then coach at Brown Steve Gladstone.

In 1994 Müller was the first ever single sculler rowing the 2000 meters in a time way below 6.40. Müller showed a first dominating season in his single with winning the Overall FISA Rowing World Cup and World Cup Races in Paris with a time of 6.38, Lucerne with a new 'Rotsee' record also below 6.40 and the Diamond Sculls at Henley Royal Regatta. Only at the World Championships he was defeated by the German André Willms.

After spending two years in Providence, Rhode Island, attending Brown and rowing his single scull, Müller moved to Newport Beach, California, which offered a better climate for year-round training. He also met his future wife in Newport.

Olympic debut
Müller won gold in the single scull at the 1996 Atlanta Olympics. Müller won the race with a strong finish. He was 3 seconds down and in fourth place at the 1000 meter mark (half way) and he moved up to third and just 1 second down with 500 meters to go.  Müller then launched a devastating drive to the line.  He won decisively besting Derek Porter who had led the whole race, and his childhood hero, and two-time Olympic Champion Thomas Lange who finished third.  Müller's last 500 was the fastest 500 meter split time of the day. His time of 6:44.85 has been an Olympic record until Tim Maeyens of Belgium finished his heat at the 2012 London Olympics in a time of 6:42.52.

1998 season onwards
Following his Olympic victory, Müller took a year off from rowing. In 1998, he won two World Cup race besting future rival Rob Waddell.  But at the World Rowing Championships, Waddell had the best race of his life pushing Müller back to second. In the pre-season to the 1998 rowing calendar, Waddell set a world record on the indoor rowing machine. In 1999, Waddell went on to sweep the World Cup races and the World Championships, Müller getting second each time.

Leading up to the 2000 Sydney Olympics, Müller entered World Cup race in Vienna, where he finally beat Waddell after four consecutive second-place finishes. Müller did not enter any other preliminary races, and Waddell won the World Cup race in Lucerne. Between the 1996 Olympics and the 2000 Olympics, Müller's record against Waddell was 3 out of 7.

Both Waddell and Müller won all of their preliminary heats leading up to the Olympic finals.  In the finals, in addition to his rival two-time reigning World Champion Rob Waddell, Müller faced former World Champion and Olympic silver medalist Derek Porter and rising star Marcel Hacker. It was the closest men's single scull final ever.  They battled down the course with the lead changing several times.  Müller gained the lead in the last 1000 meters, but Waddell stayed with him. Gradually, Waddell wore Müller down, passing him in the sprint. Despite having a chest cold, Müller held on for the silver medal. Hacker finished third and a disappointed Porter finished fourth.  Just over two seconds – the length of a boat – separated first from fourth place.

Retirement and career
Having lived in the United States since 1992 (and attending Brown University) Müller became a naturalized citizen of the United States in early 2004.  He then announced he would trial for the US team for the Athens Olympics. He had won all of the preliminary trial races.  However, just before the start of the final set of trials, there were a number of high-profile killings of foreigners in Iraq as part of the Iraq War, and Americans were believed to be potential targets for violence at the Olympics by al-Qaeda.  Müller pulled out of the trials, saying:

When you have three children and a wife and you leave them, then leave them again to go overseas, and you see somebody's head getting cut off ... you start having clouds in your head for why you want to proceed like this, with all the responsibility about traveling, leaving the family, etcetera.

Müller currently runs an indoor rowing studio called The Iron Oarsman in Orange County, California, and is a goodwill ambassador for the sport of rowing.  At this time, he is the sole producer of indoor rowing workout DVDs.

He is married to his wife Erin, and has four children.

Achievements
Olympic medals: 1 gold, 1 silver
World Championship medals: 3 silver
Junior World Championship medals: 1 bronze

Olympic Games
2000 – Silver, single sculls
1996 – Gold, single sculls
1992 – 12th (DNS petite finals), single sculls

World Championships
2001 – 5th, single sculls
1999 – Silver, single sculls
1998 – Silver, single sculls
1995 – 6th, single sculls
1994 – Silver, single sculls
1993 – 8th, double sculls
1991 – 11th, single sculls

Junior World Championships
1990 – Bronze, single sculls

US collegiate rowing
1993 – 1st, Varsity 8+ (Brown) Eastern Sprints
1993 – 1st, Varsity 8+ (Brown) Intercollegiate Rowing Association Championship
1993 – 1st, Varsity 8+ (Brown) National Collegiate Rowing Championship
1992 – 1st, Freshman 8+ (Brown) Eastern Sprints
1992 – 1st, Freshman 8+ (Brown) Intercollegiate Rowing Association Championship

Henley Royal Regatta
1993 – 1st, Ladies' Challenge Plate 8+ (Brown University)
1994 – 1st, Diamond Challenge Sculls 1x

References

External links
 Elite Rowing Coach – Xeno's rowing technique website & Blog
 
 
 
  Video of 1996 Olympic race
  Video of 2000 Olympic race
 Xeno Mueller Ironoarsman

1972 births
Living people
Swiss male rowers
Rowers at the 1992 Summer Olympics
Rowers at the 1996 Summer Olympics
Rowers at the 2000 Summer Olympics
Medalists at the 1996 Summer Olympics
Medalists at the 2000 Summer Olympics
Olympic rowers of Switzerland
Olympic gold medalists for Switzerland
Olympic silver medalists for Switzerland
Olympic medalists in rowing
Brown University alumni
Swiss emigrants to the United States
Rowers from Zürich
World Rowing Championships medalists for Switzerland